Low Wee Nee, also known as Weenee Low (born 9 January 1992 in Penang) is a Malaysian professional squash player. As of February 2018, she was ranked number 97 in the world. Weenee reached her highest world ranking of 74 in the women's professional tour at the age of 16. Upon graduating high school, Weenee decided to pursue her studies at Trinity College, USA where she majored in B.S Psychology and minored in Studio Arts. While thriving in her studies, Weenee accomplished a record of 41-9 in her college career, including winning the National Championship for Trinity College. Her awards and accolades include winning the CSA All American Mention (2012-2013), All- NESCAC 1ST Team (2012-2013), All- NESCAC 2nd Team (2010-2011) and James Belfiore award for overcoming adversity and inspiring teammates. She also has a sister, Low Wee Wern who is one of the top ranked players in the women's tour.

References

1992 births
Living people
Malaysian female squash players
People from Penang
21st-century Malaysian women